Prostituzione (also known as Love Angels and The Red Light Girls) is a 1974 Italian giallo film written and directed by Rino Di Silvestro.

Plot
Prostitutes in Italy find themselves being stalked by a mysterious killer.

References

External links

Hysteria Lives!

1974 films
1970s Italian-language films
1970s exploitation films
Films about prostitution in Italy
1970s thriller films
Giallo films
1970s Italian films